This is a list of social nudity places in Africa. The list includes nude beaches and naturist resorts, where people practice skinny dipping, naked bodysurfing or any other form of nude recreation.

South Africa

Beaches and other natural areas
There are no beaches in South Africa where the right to bathe nude is protected. However, Sandy Bay and the Umhlanga Lagoon and Mpenjati beach are beaches where nudity is accepted and bathers are very unlikely to be prosecuted for simply being naked. Mpenjati beach was approved as a naturist beach by the local town council in charge of the area, however the Public Protector ruled that the proper procedures had not been followed in proclaiming Mpenjati as a naturist beach. The situation at the other beaches is less certain. Nudist beaches are by nature remote and secluded and it is unfortunate that in South Africa this makes them unsafe as criminals find them ideal for their purposes too. Nudists are advised to try to keep in big groups, singles and couples should exercise a great deal of caution if visiting the lesser known nudist beaches.

Eastern Cape 
 Secrets Beach in Port Elizabeth
 Lighthouse Beach, Great Fish River between Port Alfred and East London, in 2003 there were plans to make this beach an official nudist beach; the plans never took off.
 The Striptease River Trail at the Tsitsikamma Lodge and Spa. The trail is nudist friendly; the hotel, however, is a textile hotel.

KwaZulu-Natal 
 Umhlanga Lagoon Nature Reserve, north of Durban has a section of beach unofficial used by naturists.

Application was made to the Hibiscus Coast Local Municipality to approve its use as an official nudist beach. On 28 October 2014, at their October 2014 monthly council meeting the Hibiscus Coast Local Municipality approved beach as an official naturist beach. In November 2017 the Public Protector declared that the proclamation of the beach as a nudist beach by the Municipality did not follow proper procedures and prescripts.

Western Cape 
 Sandy Bay in Cape Town is the best-known nude beach in South Africa. It is isolated by cliffs, and has no vehicle access.

Resorts

Eastern Cape 
 Buttnothing  is a suburban B&B in Port Elizabeth.

Gauteng 
 Sun Eden   and Owlsnest Deluxe Naturist Chalet in the Bush  are near Pretoria.

KwaZulu-Natal 
 Hooting Owl  is a B&B south of Margate about 1 km from the Indian Ocean coast. "The whole guest house property can also be booked as a clothing optional retreat for Naturist/Nudist groups on request." 

North West Province 
 Harmony Nature Farm  is nestled on the cliffs of the Magaliesberg mountains
 Kiepersolkloof  is a private nature reserve near Rustenburg
 Voëlkop  is a men-only gay nude resort in Makolokwe between Pretoria and Rustenburg.
 Vyedam Naturist Resort  is in the Hekpoort valley surrounded by the Magaliesberg and Wittewater mountains.

Western Cape 
 Bare Necessities in Suurbraak.
 Sun Kissed Villa in Hout Bay.

Notes and references

Notes

References

External links
KwaZulu-Natal Naturist Association

Africa
Africa
Lists of places
Africa-related lists